Kapp Records was an independent record label started in 1954 by David Kapp, brother of Jack Kapp (who set up American Decca Records in 1934). David Kapp founded his own label after stints with Decca and RCA Victor. Kapp licensed its records to London Records for release in the UK.

In 1967, David Kapp sold his label to MCA Inc. and the label was placed under Uni Records management; Kapp was consolidated with MCA's other record labels in 1971 and, in 1973, MCA Records released the last Kapp record. Catalogue albums that continued to sell were renumbered and reissued on the MCA label.

Kapp's subsidiaries included Medallion Records (an audiophile label), Congress Records, Leader Records, and Four Corners Records with its "4 Corners of the World" logo. Four Corners was formed to promote European artists, such as Françoise Hardy, Raymond Lefèvre, and the Barclay Singers.

Today, the Kapp Records catalog is owned by MCA's successor-in-interest Universal Music Group through its Geffen Records subsidiary.

History
 1954: Kapp Records was created by David Kapp.
 1960: Kapp Records released one of the first cover versions of songs from The Sound of Music, which was running on Broadway at that time. The Pete King Chorale was featured on the album.
 1964: Kapp Records released "Hello Dolly" sung by Louis Armstrong that became the number one song in America on Billboard Top 100, two months after The Beatles' arrived from England. The label also distributed American releases by another successful British Invasion group, The Searchers.
 1966: The record label released the original cast album of Man of La Mancha, perhaps their most successful cast album.
 1967: David Kapp sold his label to MCA Inc. and it became a division of Uni Records.
 1973: MCA released the last Kapp record. The catalog and artist roster was absorbed by MCA Records.
 2003: MCA Records is absorbed into Geffen Records, which currently manages Kapp's pop/rock/R&B catalogs. The country, jazz, and musical theatre catalogs are now managed by MCA Nashville Records, GRP Records, and Decca Broadway, respectively. Decca Broadway released a remastered version of the Man of La Mancha original cast album in 2001.

Label variations

Throughout Kapp's history, its logo was a stylized "K" incorporating a phonograph record design. Three versions of this logo appeared during the company's history. Until 1970, this logo also appeared on a drum major's cap in a wordplay of the label's name.

1950s: Stylized "K/record" logo and KAPP at top of either red/white, silver/maroon or purplish red/white labels.
Early 1960s: Black label with white "K/record" logo and KAPP in red at top, a similar design had a red drum major cap and KAPP in yellow at top.
Mid to late 1960s: Black label with red drum major cap (showing "K/record" logo in yellow) and KAPP in black letters in white box at left for singles, at top for albums.
1970-1972: Purple, red, orange and yellow label with new "K" logo, either in black or in white inside black box, at left. (A few 1970s releases were also pressed with the mid-to-late 1960s black label.)

Roster

Eddie Albert
Louis Armstrong
The Three of Us
Paul Arnoldi
Fred Astaire
Burt Bacharach
Kenny Ball
Kenny Ballard
Gilbert Bécaud
Budgie
Change
Maybelle Carter
Cher
The Critters
Johnny Cymbal
The D-Men
Bill Dana (a.k.a. José Jiménez)
Anita Darian, 1960, a self-titled album, Anita Darian (later titled East of the Sun), KL-1168
El Chicano
Dean Elliott
Shirley Ellis (Congress)
Jerry Fielding
The Flying Machine (Congress)
The Fortune Tellers (Robert Maxwell (songwriter)) (Medallion)
The Four Lads
Sergio Franchi (Four Corners)
Frank Gallop
The Ginger Snaps (including Judi Weiner)
Tom Glazer
Good Rats
The Greenwood County Singers (including Van Dyke Parks)
Françoise Hardy (Four Corners)
Joe Harnell
Bill Hayes
The Hesitations
Gregory Howard and group
Brian Hyland (Leader & Kapp)
Jellyroll
Elton John (two singles on Congress)
Jack Jones
Just Us
Jerry Keller
The Kids Next Door (Four Corners)
Pete King Chorale
Eartha Kitt
The Latin Souls
Raymond Lefèvre (Four Corners)
Charles Lloyd
Rod McKuen
Miriam Makeba
Sam Makia and the Makapuu Beach Boys
Jo Mapes
Carmen McRae
David McWilliams
Chad Mitchell Trio
Art Mooney
Jane Morgan
Billy Mure (Tough Strings, KL-1253)
The Nightcrawlers
Linda Perhacs
Leroy Pullins
Pat Rolle
Patty Lace & the Petticoats
David Rose
Ruby & the Romantics
The Searchers
Kermit Schaefer
Linda Scott
Harry Simeone Chorale
Cal Smith
Silver Apples
Sonny & Cher
Sugar & Spice
Sundance
Sylvia Telles
Thee Prophets
Mel Tillis
The Trophies
The Unifics
Billy Usselton
Leroy Van Dyke
Lenny Welch
Billy Edd Wheeler
Roger Williams
Bob Wills
The "You Know Who" Group (Four Corners)

References

Hall, Claude: "MCA Drops Vocalion, Decca, Kapp and Uni", Billboard, February 10, 1973

External links
 Kapp Records story from BSN Pubs
 A collection of Kapp record labels
 Kapp Records 45 rpm discography
 Kapp Records on the Internet Archive's Great 78 Project

American record labels
Jazz record labels
Record labels established in 1954
Record labels disestablished in 1972
Pop record labels
MCA Records